Ciarán Lenehan is an Irish Gaelic footballer who currently plays for Meath Senior Football Championship club Skryne and the Meath county team. Lenehan made his senior inter-county debut against Kildare in the Leinster Senior Football Championship quarter-final.

Honours
Meath Senior Football Championship: 1
2010
Lenister Minor Football Championship:1
2008

References

Living people
Gaelic football backs
Meath inter-county Gaelic footballers
Skryne Gaelic footballers
Year of birth missing (living people)